The 23rd Arab League Summit was the third one held in Baghdad and the first one since 1990, before the start of the Gulf War. The decision to grant the host rights to Iraq was made at the previous summit in Sirte. Among the subjects discussed were the Iraqi debts to its neighbors and the uprising in Syria. The summit marked the first time since the Invasion of Kuwait that an acting Emir (Sabah Al-Ahmad Al-Jaber Al-Sabah) paid a visit to Iraq. The summit was also notable as being the first held since the beginning of the Arab Spring, during which the governments of several member states were overthrown by popular revolutions.

Background and preparations 

The summit had been delayed several times due to regional unrest across the Arab world, but was scheduled to begin on March 29. The Iraqi government sent invitations to all members except Syria, who were suspended in the midst of the uprising against the Assad regime. Bahrain announced in late February that it intended to skip the summit, citing concerns with the Iraqi government as well as security issues. Later this decision was overturned and the government announced they would attend the summit.

The Iraqi government reportedly spent almost $500 million to clean up Baghdad, including new pavement for major highways, the renovation of several hotels, repainting of buildings and the complete overhaul of the former Republican Palace inside the Green Zone. By some estimates close to 3 million flowers and 500,000 trees were planted in the capital in the weeks leading to the event.

Security concerns
The umbrella group Islamic State of Iraq promised to disrupt the summit as part of a new stage of "real confrontation and war against the despicable (Shiites)" in a statement released after the pan-Iraq bombings on February 23 that left 60 dead and more than 250 injured. The group repeated this threat after the 20 March 2012 Iraq attacks even though the heavy security presence in Baghdad appeared to have lowered the number of bombings within the city.

The government responded with the announcement of unprecedented security measures, including the temporary shut down of all operations at Baghdad International Airport from 26 March until the end of the summit three days later. According to Maj. Gen. Hassan al-Baydhani an estimated 26,000 security forces will guard the capital, with 4,000 reinforcements being brought from the southern and northern provinces. Most of them will be stationed near the airport, the major highways and hotels and the already heavily fortified Green Zone.

The influential Shiite leader Muqtada al-Sadr banned his followers from staging any demonstrations during the summit. Thousands of people attended earlier marches against the Saudi intervention in Bahrain's uprising and it is feared that such scenes will embarrass the Iraqi government as well as guests at the conference.

The heavy security preparations appeared to have paid off, as there was a single suicide attack in Baghdad on March 27 that left one person dead and four injured. Two days later three rockets were fired towards the Green Zone as foreign dignitaries and nine heads of state were preparing for discussions inside the Republican Palace. One of the missiles landed near the Iranian embassy, breaking windows, but inflicting no casualties.

Attendance

Arab League representatives
  Algeria - low-level delegation
  Bahrain - low-level delegation
  Comoros - President Ikililou Dhoinine
  Djibouti - President Ismaïl Omar Guelleh
  Egypt - low-level delegation
  Iraq - Prime Minister Nouri al-Maliki & President Jalal Talabani
  Jordan - low-level delegation
  Kuwait - Sheikh Sabah Al-Ahmad Al-Jaber Al-Sabah
  Lebanon - President Michel Sulaiman
  Libya - Chairman Mustafa Abdul Jalil
  Mauritania - President Mohamed Ould Abdel Aziz
  Morocco - low-level delegation
  Oman - low-level delegation
  State of Palestine - President of the PNA Mahmoud Abbas
  Qatar - low-level delegation
  Saudi Arabia - Ambassador to the Arab League & Egypt Ahmed Qatan
  Somalia - President Sharif Sheikh Ahmed
  Sudan - President Omar al-Bashir
  Tunisia - President Moncef Marzouki
  United Arab Emirates - low-level delegation
  Yemen - low-level delegation

Other participants
  United Nations - Secretary-General Ban Ki-moon
  Arab League - Secretary-General Nabil Elaraby
   United Nations \ Arab League Special Envoy on Syria - Kofi Annan

External links
Official website (in Arabic)

References

2012 Arab League summit
2012 in Iraq
21st-century diplomatic conferences (MENA)
2012 in international relations
2012 conferences
Diplomatic conferences in Iraq
2010s in Baghdad
March 2012 events in Asia
March 2012 events in Iraq